Julián Gabriel Cardozo (born January 2, 1991, in Santa Fe, Argentina) is an Argentine professional footballer who plays as a midfielder.

References

External links
 
 ascensomx.net

1991 births
Living people
Argentine footballers
Argentine expatriate footballers
Footballers from Santa Fe, Argentina
Association football midfielders
Argentine Primera División players
Peruvian Primera División players
Arsenal de Sarandí footballers
Club Aurora players
Mineros de Zacatecas players
Murciélagos FC footballers
Club Atlético Zacatepec players
Sport Boys footballers
Deportivo Achuapa players
Argentine expatriate sportspeople in Bolivia
Argentine expatriate sportspeople in Mexico
Argentine expatriate sportspeople in Peru
Argentine expatriate sportspeople in Guatemala
Expatriate footballers in Bolivia
Expatriate footballers in Mexico
Expatriate footballers in Peru
Expatriate footballers in Guatemala